Timo Andres (born Timothy Andres in 1985 in Palo Alto, California) is an American composer and pianist. He grew up in rural Connecticut and lives in Brooklyn, New York.

Biography

After growing up in rural Connecticut, an environment that greatly influences his work, Timo Andres attended Yale University for both his undergraduate and graduate education, studying with Martin Bresnick, Ingram Marshall, Aaron Jay Kernis, Christopher Theofanidis, John Halle, Matthew Suttor, Kathryn Alexander, Michael Klingbeil, and Orianna Webb. He is also a graduate of Juilliard's pre-college program.

Andres first rose to prominence at the age of 24 when his piece Nightjar was commissioned and performed by the Los Angeles Philharmonic and John Adams. Since then, he has been commissioned by Wigmore Hall, Carnegie Hall, the Concertgebouw Amsterdam, San Francisco Performances, the Gilmore Foundation and the Library of Congress. Andres has performed solo recitals at (Le) Poisson Rouge, Wigmore Hall and Lincoln Center, and alongside artists such as Gabriel Kahane, Philip Glass, and David Kaplan.

Works
Andres's work has received broad critical acclaim and is particularly noted for its seamless blend of traditional and contemporary idioms. Alex Ross of The New Yorker has called Andres "quietly awesome" and his music "the kind of sprawling, brazen work that a young composer should write."

Andres draws from a wide array of influences, including bands such as Sigur Rós, Boards of Canada, Brian Eno and Radiohead, as well as classical music by Brahms, Schumann, Mozart, and Charles Ives. He is also influenced by his love of design and typography.

Compositions and projects 

Chamber music
2004 Violin Sonata for violin and piano
2004 "Formal Conceits" for flute, clarinet, violin, ’cello, and piano
2006 "I Found it in the Woods" outdoor music for flute, viola, and harp
2006 "Strider" ambient music for vibraphone and piano
2006 "Five-Speed Automatic" fanfare for trumpet, horn, and trombone
2006 "The Night Jaunt" traveling music for flute, clarinet, electric guitar, bass, and piano
2007 "Play it by Ear" for clarinet, bassoon, horn, string quartet, bass, and piano (or clarinet and piano)
2007 "Talking About Dancing" for baroque violin, bass gamba, and harpsichord
2007 "I Found it by the Sea" variations for piano quartet
2008 "Some Connecticut Gospel" for flute (doubling alto), bassoon, trombone, piano, violin, viola, ’cello, and bass
2009 "Fast Flows the River" for ’cello and Hammond organ (or MIDI keyboard)
2009 "Crashing Through Fences" for piccolo, glockenspiel, and two kickdrums
2010 "Clamber Music" free variations for two violins and piano
2010 "Thrive on Routine" for string quartet
2010 "Trade Winds" for clarinet, string quartet, percussion, and piano
2011 "You broke it, you bought it" for percussion and electric guitar
2012 "Trade Secrets" for alto flute, percussion, violin, and ‘cello
2012 "Piano Quintet" for string quartet & piano
2013 "Safe Travels" for flute, clarinet, trumpet, violin, viola, and ‘cello
2013 "Early to Rise" for string quartet
2013 "Austerity Measures" for percussion quartet
2014 "Checkered Shade" for flute, clarinet, violin, ‘cello, percussion, and piano
2014 "Inner Circle" for flute, clarinet, and marimba
2014 "Mooring" for piano quartet
2015 "Strong Language" for string quartet
2015 "Words Fail" for violin and piano
2016 "Tides and Currents" for two pianos and two percussionists
2016 "Land Lines" for triple brass quintet
2017 "Steady Gaze" for flute and piano
2017 "Listen to the radio a lot" for snare drum and electronics
2018 "Piano Trio" for violin, cello, and piano

Keyboard Music
2007 "Shy and Mighty" album for two pianos
2007 "How can I live in your world of ideas?" for solo piano
2007 "Sorbet" for solo piano
2010 "It takes a long time to become a good composer" for solo piano
2011 "At the River" for solo piano
2011 "Retro Music" for piano four-hands
2012 "Old Friend" for solo piano
2013 "Clear and Cold" for solo piano
2013 "Heavy Sleep" for solo piano
2016 "Zefiro Torna" paraphrase for solo piano
2017 "Wise Words" for solo piano
2017 "Old Ground" for solo piano
2017 "Moving Études" for solo piano

Large Ensemble
2008 "Senior" for string quartet and orchestra
2008 "Nightjar" for chamber orchestra
2008 "Home Stretch" concerto for piano and chamber orchestra
2009 "Bathtub Shrine" elegy for full orchestra
2010 "Paraphrase on themes of Brian Eno" for chamber orchestra
2010 "How to Pop and Lock in Thirteen Steps" for chamber orchestra
2011 "Old Keys" concerto for piano and small orchestra
2014 "Word of Mouth" for chamber orchestra
2015 "Running Theme" for string orchestra
2015 "The Blind Banister" concerto for piano and orchestra
2016 "Everything Happens So Much" for full orchestra
2017 "Steady Hand" for two pianos and chamber orchestra
2017 "Upstate Obscura" for cello and chamber orchestra

Vocal
2010 "Family Plays" for high male voice and piano
2010 "Are your fingers long enough?" for female voice, double bass, and looping pedal
2011 "Two River Songs" for baritone, violin, and piano
2011 "Comfort Food" for women’s chorus and mixed nonet
2013 "Work Songs" for three voices, two guitars, keyboard, accordion, and piano
2015 "Schubertiana" for mezzo-soprano, viola, horn, and piano
2015 "Mirror Songs" for male voice and piano

Others
2010 "Mozart Coronation Concerto re-composition" for piano and orchestra
2011 "Scores for Jonathan Ehrenberg’s Moth and Seed" for piano and electronics
2011 "Frank Tell project" for violin and electronics
2012 "Histories" for l’histoire ensemble
2015 "Requiem" for chorus and orchestra
2015 "Small Wonder" for solo cello
2019 The Decalogue an album by Timo and Sufjan Stevens

Awards
2004 BMI Student Composer Award
2008 Charles Ives Prize
2013 Morton Gould Young Composer Award
2013 Music Alive Residency Award
2016 Pulitzer Prize finalist in music 
2016 Glenn Gould Protege Prize

Recordings
2010 – "Shy and Mighty" (Nonesuch) with David Kaplan, piano
2013 – "Home Stretch" (Nonesuch) with Metropolis Ensemble and Andrew Cyr
2019 – "Work Songs" (New Amsterdam) with Becca Stevens, Gabriel Kahane, Ted Hearne, Nathan Koci, and Taylor Levine
2019 – The Decalogue, with Sufjan Stevens

References

External links

Interview on The Next Track podcast

1985 births
American male composers
21st-century American composers
Yale University alumni
Living people
Nonesuch Records artists
Musicians from Palo Alto, California
Musicians from Connecticut
Musicians from Brooklyn
City of Toronto's Glenn Gould Protégé Prize winners
21st-century American male musicians